Ossian, ou Les bardes (English: Ossian, or The Bards) is an opera in five acts by the French composer Jean-François Le Sueur.

Performance history
Le Sueur probably began work on the opera as early as 1795. It was first performed at the Paris Opera on 10 July 1804. The premiere was a huge success, especially with Emperor Napoleon, who was a great admirer of the Ossian poems. Napoleon was so enthusiastic, he invited the composer to join him in the imperial box at the third act and the next day he sent Le Sueur a gold casket engraved "The Emperor Napoleon to the author of Les bardes", containing the cross of the Légion d'honneur. The opera received almost 70 performances over the next 12 years.

Roles

Synopsis
The opera is set in an imaginary Scotland in the third century AD. Caledonia has been invaded by the Scandinavians under their leader Duntalmo. He oppresses the Caledonians and imposes the worship of Odin on them. He also plans to marry his son Mornal to Rosmala, daughter of the bard Rozmor, who is already betrothed to the bard and warrior Ossian. Finally, a group of Caledonians defeat the Scandinavians and Ossian is able to marry Rosmala.

The work
The opera is on an epic scale and contains many experimental elements. For instance, act 4 has visions of heroes and bards in a cave behind a backlit curtain of gauze. The score also calls for 12 harps as the bards hymn the rising sun. According to the musicologist David Charlton, Les bardes turns away from the classical aesthetic of Gluck (the dominant operatic influence of the time in France) and prefigures grand opera. The work had an influence on Le Sueur's most famous pupil, Hector Berlioz.

References

Further reading
The Viking Opera Guide ed. Holden, Amanda (Viking, 1993)
From Gaelic to Romantic: Ossianic Translations edited by Fiona J. Stafford (Rodopi, 1988)

External links

Ossian; ou, Les bardes. Opéra en 5 actes, digitized by BYU on archive.org

Operas
French-language operas
Operas by Jean-François Le Sueur
Opera world premieres at the Paris Opera
Operas set in Scotland
Operas set in fictional, mythological and folkloric settings
Operas based on literature